The Martin County Courthouse is the county courthouse for Martin County, Minnesota. The building is located at 201 Lake Avenue on the western side of the city of Fairmont, on a hill overlooking Lake Sisseton. It is a Beaux Arts building featuring a high copper dome with four clock faces. The first floor was made out of Michigan sandstone. The second and third stories are built of Bedford limestone. The arched entrance is flanked by polished double Corinthian order columns and topped by a pediment. 

The building is connected to the brick and concrete Martin County Security Building by skyway on second level, and by tunnel below ground, at basement level. The security building provides space for police and detention, and was designed by 1972.

History 
The building was designed by Charles E. Bell and built by J. B. Nelson for $125,000 during 1906-1907. Interior murals of figures representing Peace, War, Inspiration, Genius, Sentence, and The Execution were painted by Franz E. Rohrbeck of Milwaukee. Interior finishing includes marble countertops, metalwork, and stained glass. The original clock, seated at the base of the domed roof, was designed and manufactured by noted clockmaker Seth Thomas. It features four 7 foot tall clocks, one on each side of the tower.

Renovation of the building began in late 2020, with the aim of replacing the leaking copper roof, as well as restoring the clockworks inside of the tower.

References

External links

Beaux-Arts architecture in Minnesota
Buildings and structures in Martin County, Minnesota
Clock towers in Minnesota
County courthouses in Minnesota
Courthouses on the National Register of Historic Places in Minnesota
Government buildings completed in 1907
National Register of Historic Places in Martin County, Minnesota